The 1992 Campeonato Brasileiro Série A was the 36th edition of the Campeonato Brasileiro Série A. The competition was won by Flamengo.

Format
First Stage: 20 clubs playing against each other once. The eight best placed teams qualified to the second stage.

Second Stage: 8 clubs divided in 2 groups of 4 teams each; playing against the other teams of their respective groups twice. The winner of each group qualify to the final.

Final: The finalists play against each other twice, the club with the best performance in the competition has the advantage of winning the competition if it draw both matches.

Competition standings

First stage

Second stage

Finals

 Before the match, an upper stand in the stadium collapsed, leading to the death of three spectators and injuring 82 others.

Final standings

References

External links
 Campeonato Brasileiro Série A 1992 at RSSSF

1992
1
Stadium disasters